Bank of Washington, West End Branch is a historic bank building located at Washington, Beaufort County, North Carolina.  It was built about 1854, and is a two-story, stuccoed brick temple-form building in the Greek Revival style. The front facade features a tetrastyle Ionic order portico.

It was listed on the National Register of Historic Places in 1971.

References

Bank buildings on the National Register of Historic Places in North Carolina
Greek Revival architecture in North Carolina
Commercial buildings completed in 1854
Buildings and structures in Beaufort County, North Carolina
National Register of Historic Places in Beaufort County, North Carolina
1854 establishments in North Carolina